Naich (Urdu: نا ئچ) is a village of in Tehsil Pind Dadan Khan, District Jhelum, Punjab.

References

Populated places in Jhelum District